The Goats were an American alternative hip hop trio from Philadelphia, Pennsylvania.

History
The group (whose name, according to Swayzack, was chosen to join the word "scapegoats" and the saying "Don't get my goat," concluding that they felt the government had definitely gotten their goat at the time of formation) began in 1991 with founding vocalists rappers OaTie Kato (James D'Angelo),   and Swayzack (Patrick Shupe), with the Earlier lineup formation during the 1991 era featured the sisters Love and Rucyl Mills and Oatie's brother Vinnie Angel. They released one self-titled cassette tape with this lineup shortly after being introduced to Madd (a.k.a. "the M-A-the-double-D", Maxx Stoyanoff Williams) via the dance musician King Britt. 

Unusually for a rap group, the Goats had a full musical band as well, which included drummer Chuck Treece and multi-instrumentalists Pierce Ternay and bassist E.J. Simpson. Mark Boyce ( Boss Hogg, Delta 72, and G. Love and Special Sauce) contributed keyboards and voiced many of the characters on "Tricks of the Shade"  A Ruff House promotion photo shows an eight-piece lineup. 

The group recorded on Columbia Records / Ruffhouse Records, and their first album, Tricks of the Shade (1992), has been called one of the best Philadelphia albums of all time.

They released two studio albums. Tricks of the Shade (1992) was produced by OaTie Kato and producer Joe "the Butcher" Nicolo) and released by Ruffhouse Records.  It peaked at No. 58 in the UK Albums Chart in August 1994. Their follow-up album was No Goats, No Glory (1994), released by Columbia Records.

The Goats toured with Urge Overkill, Dog Eat Dog, Cypress Hill, Public Enemy, Beastie Boys and Luscious Jackson.

In 1994, OaTie Kato departed The Goats, reportedly because he missed a plane flight to a tour date. He was replaced by vocalist and drummer Derek "D'Recka" Pierce. later projects have included working alongside his brother directing and writing the 2007 film, The Orange Thief, which won a number of festival circuit awards, and founding the group Jimmy Luxury in 2009 which was signed to Sony Records. He has since left the music business and now holds seminars on the use of Bitcoin and various other topics such as climate change. Swayzack would cease all musical activity after the band broke up. Remaining member Madd continued to perform and produce music until the early 2000s, first with the Goats spin-off group Incognegro and later with Black Landlord.

In 2019, they released a live album, Live at Khyber Pass — July 4th, 1993, which was featured on the iTunes UK landing page for a week. In the introduction to the 2019 book about Ruffhouse Records,  by Chris Schwartz, The Roots lead man QuestLove writes that the Goats requested his band to warm up for them, resulting in their first live show.

Discography

Albums
 Tricks of the Shade - Ruffhouse/Columbia – 1992
 No Goats, No Glory - Ruffhouse/Columbia – 1994
 Live at Khyber Pass — July 4th, 1993 – 2019

References

External links

 Official website
 Official page at MySpace
 

Musical groups from Philadelphia
Rap rock groups
Columbia Records artists
Ruffhouse Records artists
American hip hop groups
Hip hop groups from Philadelphia
Musical groups established in 1992
Musical groups disestablished in 1994